Topaz was an Irish petroleum retail chain owned by the Canadian multinational, Couche-Tard, which had a presence across the island of Ireland. The legal entity was formed in 2005 and previously traded under the Statoil and Shell brands, until 2008 when the Topaz brand replaced both in Ireland. In June 2018, The Topaz brand was replaced by Circle K.

History
The company was formed by Ion Equity in 2005 as a vehicle to take over part of the Irish operations of Royal Dutch Shell plc (the filling station and home heating operation, Irish Shell Limited) as well as the Irish operations of Statoil. This was controversial in itself, as the Competition Authority, which must approve large mergers and acquisitions, failed to take a decision on the takeover of Statoil's assets within the time frame allowed, thus automatically approving the deal. This was the first time this had happened in the Authority's history. 

The company was slow to reveal its branding strategy, continuing at first to trade under the Shell,  Statoil, and Fareplay brands. However, beginning in March 2008, Topaz began replacing both these brands with its own. The Fareplay brand, which Topaz owns worldwide rights to, has also been retired and replaced with a number of Topaz convenience store brands including Topaz Restore, Topaz Express and later Re.Store.

As of 2012, Topaz operated 118 Company Owned Company Operated (COCO) sites in the Republic of Ireland and 1 site in Larne, County Antrim, Northern Ireland

Billionaire Denis O'Brien owned Topaz, having bought €300 million of its loans from Irish Bank Resolution Corporation (IBRC). In May 2014, O'Brien appointed former Taoiseach Brian Cowen to the board of Topaz to join himself, his nephew (who is also CEO of Smiles Dental), Sean Corkery (CEO of O'Brien's Siteserv), Lucy Gaffney (chairperson of O'Brien's Communicorp) and Colm Doherty (former managing director of Allied Irish Banks). In December 2014, Topaz's parent company Kendrick Investments announced it would buy all of Esso's Irish operations. Profits at Topaz increased during O'Brien's first year of ownership.

In December 2015 it was announced that Topaz was being sold to Alimentation Couche-Tard, with the deal closing in spring 2016. Subsequently, most of the Denis O'Brien connected Directors retired from the Board and the CFO Niall Anderton was appointed as CEO.

Topaz also introduced the Miles fuel brand in 2017, this was in all Topaz petrol stations by August 2017.

In 2018, the Topaz brand was retired in favour of Alimentation Couch-Tard's international company Circle K in April 2018. As of 16 November 2018, the Nutgrove Topaz station still existed, although this has changed to Circle K.

In 2019, the company was acquired by DP world for a deal worth $1.1 billion.

References

External links
 

Oil companies of the Republic of Ireland
Defunct energy companies of the Republic of Ireland